La Joya Community High School (LJ, LJCHS, or LHS) is a community high school located in Avondale, Arizona, US. It serves grades 9 through 12 and is part of the Tolleson Union High School District. Currently 2200 students are enrolled.

Their Principal name is Mrs. Stacie Almaraz. Currently the school is teaching students from 9th grade to 12 grade.

References

External links 
 School website

Schools in Maricopa County, Arizona
Educational institutions established in 2002
Public high schools in Arizona
2002 establishments in Arizona